Kady is a given name. Notable people with the name include:

Kady Brownell
Kady Dandeneau, Canadian wheelchair basketball player
Kady Iuri Borges Malinowski, Brazilian footballer
Kady Malloy
Kady MacDonald Denton
Kady McDermott
Kady O'Malley

See also
Kady
Cady (given name)
Kadi (name)
Cadi